Manchester Dock was a dock on the River Mersey in England and a part of the Port of Liverpool. The dock was not part of the interconnected dock system, but was connected directly to the river.

History
In the 1780s, the docks at Liverpool were expanding, and the Manchester Basin was built to the north of the Canning Dock. It was a tidal basin which was linked directly to the river, and was not linked directly to the other docks. The benefits of turning it into a proper dock were soon realised, and an entrance lock was constructed between 1810 and 1815, by John Foster, Sr., after which it was known as the Manchester Dock. The dock was an important gateway for the export of coal and manufactured goods, and for the import of corn and cotton. With the formation of the Shropshire Union Railways and Canal Company in 1845, the dock was used to hold their barges, and later those of the Great Western Railway, who transferred goods between the dock and their rail terminal at Morpeth Dock in Birkenhead.

The Liverpool Docks were controlled by the Docks Committee between 1825 and 1857. Most of the increase was achieved by the construction of new docks, but they also purchased the Manchester Dock in 1851. Control of the docks passed to the Mersey Docks and Harbour Board in 1858.

By the 1920s, the dock traffic waned. Manchester Dock and the adjacent Chester Basin were dangerously subsiding because of excavation works for the Queensway Tunnel which ran underneath the site. Both docks were filled in by 1936, using rubble obtained from the construction of the tunnel. The area later became a car park, sealing the remains under a protective layer of tarmac.

Excavation

In 2006/7, the dock was excavated as part of a major construction project for the new Museum of Liverpool and the Leeds and Liverpool Canal link to the Canning and Albert Docks. These excavations also exposed the neighbouring Chester Basin, and have provided important archaeological information as the entrance lock is one of the oldest in the whole Liverpool Docks complex. Most other locks of a similar age have either been destroyed or extensively modified.

References

Sources

Further reading

External links

 

Liverpool docks
Transport in Liverpool
Canals in England
Redeveloped ports and waterfronts in Merseyside
Manchester Dock
1785 establishments in England